Air Commodore John Glanville Hearson,  (5 August 1883 – 9 January 1964) was a squadron and wing commander and senior staff officer in the Royal Flying Corps during the First World War, and a senior commander in the fledgling Royal Air Force (RAF) during the 1920s.

Military career
Pearson was commissioned a second lieutenant in the Royal Engineers on 31 July 1902. He transferred to the Royal Air Force on its formation.

He reached the rank of brigadier general in 1917, and became the RAF's first Director of Training on the service's formation in April 1918. Remaining in the RAF after the war, he was promoted to air commodore on 30 June 1923. In the first half of the 1920s he held senior positions on RAF Iraq Command, the British organisation responsible for maintaining control of Iraq.

Towards the end of 1925 Hearson was appointed Air Officer Commanding the Special Reserve and Auxiliary Air Force which later became the Air Defence Group and then No. 1 (Air Defence) Group. Hearson retired from the RAF in 1927 but returned to service in the build up before the Second World War to establish and command the UK's barrage balloon organisation.

References

External links
Air of Authority – A History of RAF Organisation – Air Commodore J G Hearson

|-

|-

1883 births
1964 deaths
British Army personnel of World War I
Commanders of the Order of the British Empire
Companions of the Distinguished Service Order
Companions of the Order of the Bath
Recipients of the Order of St. Anna, 3rd class
Royal Air Force generals of World War I
Royal Air Force officers
Royal Air Force personnel of World War II
Royal Flying Corps officers
Royal Engineers officers